Trans-Continental Hustle is the fifth album by gypsy punk band Gogol Bordello, released on April 27, 2010.  Produced by Rick Rubin, Trans-Continental Hustle primarily draws inspiration from frontman Eugene Hütz's life in Brazil, where he had been living since 2008. This album is Gogol Bordello's major record label debut. The collaboration with Rubin was initiated after guitarist Tom Morello of Rage Against the Machine saw Gogol Bordello perform in Los Angeles and recommended that Rubin look into the band. "Immigraniada (We Comin' Rougher)", the fifth track on the album, has received heavy airplay on Sirius XM Radio's Faction Channel 41 as well as other genre stations. At least two of Faction's shows have played the single, including Faction's The Jason Ellis Show and Faction with Christian James Hand.

Track listing

Personnel
The Band
 Eugene Hütz - vocals, acoustic guitar, percussion
 Sergey Ryabtsev - violin, backing vocals
 Yuri Lemeshev - accordion, backing vocals
 Oren Kaplan - guitar, backing vocals
 Thomas Gobena - bass, backing vocals
 Pamela Jintana Racine - percussion, backing vocals, dance
 Elizabeth Sun - percussion, backing vocals, dance
 Pedro Erazo - percussion, MC
 Oliver Charles - drums

References

External links

 
 

2010 albums
Gogol Bordello albums
Albums produced by Rick Rubin
American Recordings (record label) albums